SS John H. Hammond was a Liberty ship built in the United States during World War II. She was named after John Hays Hammond, a mining engineer, diplomat, and philanthropist.

Construction
John H. Hammond was laid down on 13 October 1944, under a Maritime Commission (MARCOM) contract, MC hull 2385, by J.A. Jones Construction, Brunswick, Georgia; she was sponsored by Mrs. R. Gregg Cherry, wife of then governor elect R. Gregg Cherry, and launched on 15 November 1944.

History
She was allocated to William J. Rountree Company, on 27 November 1944. On 17 July 1945, she struck a mine off Elba, Italy, and was towed to Naples, Italy. She was declared a constructive total loss (CTL).

References

Bibliography

 
 
 
 
 
 

 

Liberty ships
Ships built in Brunswick, Georgia
1944 ships
Ships sunk by mines
Maritime incidents in July 1945